In mathematics, Gottlieb polynomials are a family of discrete orthogonal polynomials introduced by . They are given by

References

Orthogonal polynomials